The total revenue share is the percentage of direct cost associated with revenue. Direct cost consists of both product cost and marketing cost. It is a ratio of costs required to fulfill an order. The remainder is considered gross margin.

Financial ratios